Lawrence Storione (1867–1922) was a Fife miner and political figure. He is best known for founding the Anarchist Communist League in Cowdenbeath, Scotland.

Life
Apparently the son of the Italian stonemason Felix Storione and Philomena Moir (or Noir), and a French citizen according to the United Kingdom Census 1901, Lawrence Storione worked as a miner in Italy, France, Belgium and the west of Scotland. In 1908, he settled in Lumphinnans, Fife, after fleeing France dressed as a woman. He married Annie Cowan whom he met whilst living in Hamilton, Lanarkshire in 1900. They named their children Annie, Germinal, Libertie, Autonomie, Grace and Anarchie.

He was injured in a pit accident during the First World War.

He died in 1922.

Political Activity
Storione founded the Fife Anarchist Communist League in Cowdenbeath, which 'preached a heady mixture of De Leonist Marxism and the anarchist teachings of Kropotkin and Stirner, a libertarian communism which was fiercely critical of the union.'

The League ran a bookshop in Cowdenbeath and his eldest daughter, Annie, ran the Proletarian Sunday School which used the Industrial Workers of the World's Little Red Songbook.

References

External links
 Biography of Lawrence Storione on Libcom.org

Anarchist theorists
Scottish anarchists
Industrial Workers of the World members
1867 births
1922 deaths
People from Lumphinnans
Scottish people of Italian descent
French emigrants to Scotland
French people of Italian descent
Anarchism in Scotland